The Love War (1970) is a science fiction ABC Movie of the Week starring Lloyd Bridges as an alien warrior and Angie Dickinson as the woman he befriends.

It was originally advertised and broadcast under the title The Sixth Column.

Plot
Two warring planets choose to settle their conflict over which of them will take over the planet Earth, each sending a trio of soldiers to Earth to fight to the death. The combatants, disguised as human beings, can only identify each other by using special visors.

Kyle, one of the combatants, falls in love with Sandy, a woman he meets during his stay in a small town. In the end, despite cheating by the other side, Kyle is the sole survivor, but before he can signal his people he has won, Sandy shoots him with one of the alien weapons.  A dying Kyle then learns that Sandy is also an alien; the other side has cheated twice. She chose duty to her people over her love for him. Weeping as she watches him die, she asks him what their half-breed children would have been. The film's closing shot shows Sandy through the visor as she really is — a hideously scarred humanoid. Earth faces an orgy of destruction and the extermination of humanity.

Setting 
The setting is north-central California, as the final showdown is held in a small town described as being near the city of Fresno. Much of the action was filmed in and around the town of Piru near Los Angeles.

Reception

Moria gave the movie three stars finding it good for its time, although noting it is not "hard" sci fi.

Cast
Lloyd Bridges as Kyle
Angie Dickinson as Sandy
Harry Basch as Bal
Daniel J. Travanti as Ted (as Dan Travanty)
Allen Jaffe as Hort
Bill McLean as Reed
Byron Foulger as Will
Pepper Martin	
Bob Nash as Limo Driver
Art Lewis

Home media
The movie was released on VHS cassette tape in the United Kingdom by Guild Home Video.

See also
 List of American films of 1970

References

External links

1970 films
1970s science fiction war films
ABC Movie of the Week
American science fiction war films
1970s English-language films
Films about death games
Films directed by George McCowan
1970s American films